Looking for Victoria was a 2-hour television docudrama on the life of Queen Victoria, presented by Prunella Scales and showing Scales' research for her one-woman show An Evening with Queen Victoria. It was directed by Louise Osmond and narrated by Geoffrey Palmer, whilst its cast included Charlie Hayes as the young Victoria, Tom Allen as the young Prince Albert, Andrew Sachs as Benjamin Disraeli, Timothy West as Thomas Creevey, Timothy Walker as Wilfred Scawen Blunt, Richenda Carey as Lady Wharnecliffe, David Ryall as Henry James, Charles Dance as Charles Greville and Geoffrey Bayldon as Henry Ponsonby. Filming locations included Syon House.

External links

BBC television docudramas
2003 television films
2003 films
Cultural depictions of Queen Victoria on television
BBC television documentaries about history during the 18th and 19th centuries
Cultural depictions of Albert, Prince Consort
2000s British films